Vívó és Atlétikai Club was a Hungarian football club from the town of Szentlőrinc, Budapest.

History
Vívó és Atlétikai Club debuted in the 1921–22 season of the Hungarian League and finished third.

Name Changes 
1906–1916: Vívó és Athletikai Club
1916: dissolved
1917: reestablished
1917–1926: Vívó és Atlétikai Club
1926–1927: Városi AC 
1926–1927: merger with III. Kerületi TVE 
1927–1938: VAC FC
1938–1941: Vívó és Athletikai Club
1941: dissolved
1945: reestablished
1945: Barátság Vívó és Atlétikai Club
1945–1949: Vívó és Atlétikai Club
1949: dissolved
1957: reestablished
1957: Vívó és Atlétikai Club

External links
 Profile

References

Football clubs in Hungary
1906 establishments in Hungary
Association football clubs established in 1906
Jewish organisations based in Hungary